Index trading is a type of trading of a group of stocks which make up the index. An index is a measurement of the value of a section of the stock market. It is computed from the prices of selected stocks. It may also be referred as a group of stock market publicly listed uppermost businesses within a region. 

There are numerous stock market indices within the world such as S&P/ASX 200 (Australia), FTSE100  (London), CAC 40 (France), AEX index (Amsterdam), and DAX (Germany), IBEX 35.

Trading comparison
Customarily, the investor buys the assets they put resources into and the estimation of the benefit and loss is resolved upon the changing estimation of the bought resources. For example, an investor invests $1000 for the period of three months and at the end of the specified time gains 10% of the original investment i.e. $100 (total return on the investment).

Benefits
Comparatively, index trading allows the investor to profit from any kind of stock market movement no matter if the market rises or falls in value over any given time period. This kind of trading enables the investor to trade and profit in all sorts of market conditions.

See also
 Mutual fund
 Stock market index
 Exchange-traded fund

References

External links
Official Site Of S&P/ASX 200
What Is Prop Trading Firm?
Trading Platforms & Tools

Share trading